Gentian liqueur (also known as Gentian schnapps, or Enzian liquor) is a clear liqueur produced using the roots of the gentian plant.

Production 

Gentian liqueur is produced from the maceration of the root of the gentian plant in alcohol for a length of time, followed by distillation. Additional ingredients, such as other herbs and botanicals, are typically added after distillation. The resulting liqueur can be sweetened with the addition of sugar.

Yellow gentian (Gentiana lutea), one species in the genus Gentiana, is most commonly used. Less commonly, the roots from other species of Gentiana are used, such as the purple gentian, Hungarian gentian, or spotted gentian.

In Europe, the harvesting of gentian root from the wild is strictly controlled; as a result, most gentian used for production of the spirit are cultivated for the purpose.

Properties 
Gentian liqueur has an element of bitterness that comes from the gentian root, of which the primary characteristics are "a dusty earthiness, dry floral notes, and vegetal character", according to Jérôme Corneille, production director of Salers gentian aperitif. The taste is also described as "grassy and vegetal; not horribly bitter," but having a "signature tangy aspect."

Its alcohol content by volume typically ranges from 15 to 20 percent.

Its color ranges from colorless or pale straw, to a bright, clear yellow.

History 
Gentian liqueur originated in the French Alps, in the modern-day Auvergne-Rhône-Alpes region. Mentions of "gentian" as an alcoholic beverage first appeared in writing in this region around the late 18th century, but gentian liqueurs did not rise to prominence until the late 19th century, after the invention of the continuous still allowed for the creation of neutral spirits, into which botanicals like gentian could be infused. These liqueurs were first sold as medicinal bitter tonics, but gained popularity as aperitifs. 

In Germany, the liqueur is referred to as "Enzian" (the German word for "gentian").  in Berchtesgaden, Bavaria has produced distilled gentian liquors since 1692, and is Germany's oldest gentian distillery.

As a spirit 
"Gentian" can refer to a specific type of spirit made by the distillation of a fermentation product of gentian roots (with or without added neutral spirits). As a pure distillation product, this form of gentian is classified as a spirit, as opposed to a liqueur. The EU regulates its alcoholic strength, specifying it must comprise at least 37.5 percent alcohol by volume.

See also
 Angostura bitters – which contain gentian
 Suze –  a French brand of bitters apéritif flavored with gentian

References 

Distilled drinks
Pages translated from German Wikipedia